Edward MacLiam (born Edward Wilson in 1976) is an Irish actor, known for his roles as Greg Douglas in the BBC medical drama Holby City and identical twins Adam and Gareth Regan in the BBC soap opera Doctors. MacLiam also portrayed Conor in the 2013 film Run & Jump, for which he was nominated for an Irish Film & Television Award for Best Supporting Actor.

Filmography

References

External links
 

Living people
1976 births
Irish male film actors
Irish male soap opera actors
Irish male television actors
Irish male voice actors
People from County Cork
Alumni of RADA